Hashimoto (written:  lit. "base of bridge") is the 27th most common Japanese surname. "under bridge"). Notable people with the surname include:

, Japanese fashion model and actress
, Japanese professional wrestler
, Japanese politician
, Japanese artistic gymnast
, Japanese painter
, Japanese physician who first described Hashimoto's thyroiditis
, Japanese fencer
, Japanese water polo player
, Japanese table tennis player
, Japanese actress, singer and idol
, Japanese video game developer
, Japanese inventor
, Japanese footballer
, Japanese women's basketball player
, Japanese soldier and political activist
, Japanese classical composer, violinist, conductor and music educator
, Japanese Sinologist
, Japanese singer
, Imperial Japanese Navy officer
, Japanese darts player
, Japanese model, actress, radio personality and idol
, Japanese concubine
, Japanese actress and model
, Japanese basketball player
, Japanese singer and idol,
, Japanese politician and 82nd and 83rd Prime Minister of Japan, leader of the Hashimoto faction
, Japanese samurai
, Japanese linguist
, Japanese screenwriter, film director, and producer
, Imperial Japanese Navy admiral
, Japanese professional wrestler
, a fictional character from Danganronpa Another 2: The Moon of Hope and Sun of Despair
, Japanese go player
, Japanese judoka
, Japanese shogi player
, Japanese politician and lawyer
, Japanese businessman and Chief Scout of the Scout Association of Japan
, Japanese go player
, Japanese footballer
, Japanese long-distance runner
, Japanese composer and arranger
, Japanese baseball player
, Japanese footballer
, Japanese judoka

References

Japanese-language surnames